Drimmer is a surname. Notable people with the surname include:

Debra Drimmer (born  1963), American television producer
Frederick Drimmer (1916–2000), American writer
John Drimmer, American television producer

See also
Dimmer (surname)